Edgar Franklin Cherry (June 16, 1914 – November 11, 1985) was an American football fullback who played two seasons for two different teams, the Pittsburgh Pirates and the Chicago Cardinals of the NFL. He was drafted by the Chicago Cardinals in the 7th round of the 55th pick of the 1938 NFL draft. He played college football at Hardin–Simmons University.

References

1914 births
1985 deaths
American football fullbacks
People from Wellington, Texas
Players of American football from Texas
Hardin–Simmons Cowboys football players
Pittsburgh Pirates (football) players
Chicago Cardinals players